Fuerte Island (Isla Fuerte) is a small coral island in the Caribbean Sea off the northern coast of Colombia, Córdoba department, located south of the Gulf of Morrosquillo. It is located at a distance of 11 km from mainland Colombia. It is part of the chain of islands formed by the Rosario Islands, the Archipelago of San Bernardo and Tortuguilla.

The island has very limited facilities for visitors.

Geography
Fuerte Island is approximately 1 mile in diameter and 1.5 miles from north to south. The island has an area of 3.25 km2 and an elevation of 12m. The island is encircled by reefs and some scattered rocks. Some of the rocks are visible above the water line.

Flora and fauna
The island has trees spread throughout, with royal palm trees at its center that tower above the others. The island has over 80 species of birds.

People
Island residents are mostly of African descent.

See also
 Caribbean region of Colombia
 Insular region of Colombia
 List of islands of South America

References

Further reading

External links
 Isla Fuerte. Chinci World Atlas.

Caribbean islands of Colombia